Glacier Peak is a stratovolcano in the Cascade Range, Washington state.

Glacier Peak may also refer to:
 Glacier Peak (Canadian Rockies), on the border of British Columbia and Alberta
 Glacier Peak (New Zealand), in the Southern Alps
 Glacier Peak (Oregon), in the Wallowa Mountains
 Glacier Peak (Park County, Montana), in the Beartooth Mountains
 Glacier Peak High School, Snohomish, Washington
 Glacier Peak Wilderness, a protected area surrounding Glacier Peak, Washington